Amotz Asa-El (Hebrew: אמוץ עשהאל) is a bestselling Israeli author, a former executive editor of The Jerusalem Post, a fellow at the Hartman Institute, The Jerusalem Posts senior commentator, and The Jerusalem Reports senior writer.

Career
Prior to joining the Post, Asa-El was a foreign correspondent for the San Francisco Chronicle and foreign editor of the Hebrew-language financial daily Telegraph.

Having joined The Jerusalem Post as its business editor in 1995, Asa-El was later The Posts News Editor and editor-in-chief of its overseas edition, the International Jerusalem Post, before serving as The Jerusalem Posts executive editor. In these positions, Asa-El led The Posts editorial line that blended economic conservatism, diplomatic pragmatism, political reform and cultural pluralism. As executive editor, overseeing the work of 100 writers, editors, copyeditors, designers and photographers, Asa-El directed the redesign of the daily Jerusalem Post, the remodeling of its weekend magazines and supplements, and the creation of an opinion desk, after having previously created a business desk and reinvented The International Jerusalem Post as an independent news weekly.

Asa-El is the only senior editor in The Jerusalem Post history who has never held a non-Israeli passport.

From 2006 to 2008 Asa-El led the launch of McGraw/Hill's Hebrew edition of BusinessWeek, and in 2010 he founded the Shalom Hartman Institute's Hebrew-language journal of thought Dorsheni.

A senior editor of the Jerusalem Report, a Middle East English-language newsmagazine, Asa-El has been for the past 20 years a frequent commentator of Middle Eastern affairs on outlets like Reuters, BBC, CNN, SKY, Voice of America, France24 and Israeli TV.

Asa-El's weekly column "Middle Israel" appears regularly in The Jerusalem Post since 1995, and is an attempt to present in English the Israeli centrist's view on anything, from politics and foreign affairs to business, culture, and religion. Asa-El has been quoted or published by The New York Times, The Washington Post, The Wall Street Journal, the Los Angeles Times, BBC.com, Politico, USA Today, Haaretz, The Economist, Time magazine, The New Republic, Le Figaro, The Daily Telegraph, L'Express, Azure, Harvard Political Review, The Australian, The Australian Financial Review, Jornal do Brasil, The Times of India, Politiken, and others.

Asa-El's five-part series in The Jerusalem Report about the future of the Jewish people won the Bnai Brith Journalism Award for 2018.

Since 2008 Asa-El has been a columnist for Dow Jones' MarketWatch, analyzing the Arab, Turkish, Iranian and Israeli economies as well as global issues like Western demographics, Swiss monetary policy, British unity, and the war in Ukraine.

Asa-El has been invited on lecture tours to the US, Canada, China, Brazil, Australia
and New Zealand where he addressed business leaders, diplomats, legislators, journalists, clergy and academic forums on issues relating to Middle Eastern, international and Jewish affairs. His lectures were hosted among others by the American Israel Public Affairs Committee, Jewish National Fund, Anti-Defamation League, the American Jewish Committee, the Canada Israel Committee, the Australia Israel Jewish Affairs Council, United Israel Appeal, Hadassah and Bnai Brith, as well as a variety of universities from Harvard and Columbia to the University of Melbourne and the Royal Military College of Canada.

Books
Amotz Asa-El's bestselling Hebrew book The Jewish March of Folly (Yediot, 2019) is a revisionist interpretation of the Jewish people's political history from antiquity to the dawn of Zionism.

The book has been praised as "thoroughly and persuasively revealing" by novelist A.B. Yehoshua,
"inspired writing" by Hebrew University and New York University philosopher Prof. Moshe Halbertal; "a must-read for Israel's leaders," by former defense minister and IDF chief-of-staff, Lt-Gen (res.) Moshe Ya'alon; "persuasive, important, and touching" by jurist and former education minister Amnon Rubinstein; "extraordinary and exciting," by former justice minister Dan Meridor; and as "a tour de force—a work with rare breadth and depth," by Saul Singer, co-author of Start-up Nation.

Asa-El's previous book, The Diaspora and the Lost Tribes of Israel (Universe, 2004), a geographic history of the Jewish people, was reviewed by The Wall Street Journal as "an engaging history of the Jewish experience" that "vividly captures the creativity and nomadic quality of the Jewish people."

Education
Asa-El holds graduate degrees in journalism from Columbia University in New York, in Jewish history from the Hebrew University in Jerusalem, and in Near Eastern and Judaic Studies from Brandeis University outside Boston.

Private life
Amotz Asa-El lives in Jerusalem with his wife and their three children.

References

Columbia University Graduate School of Journalism alumni
Israeli Jews
Israeli journalists
Living people
Year of birth missing (living people)
Place of birth missing (living people)
Hebrew University of Jerusalem alumni
Writers from Jerusalem